(born 1964) is a Japanese game director and game producer who currently works for Japanese Social Game company GREE. He formerly worked for Square Enix Co., Ltd. (formerly Square Co., Ltd.). He is most notably credited for creating the Front Mission and Arc the Lad media franchises.

Biography

Masaya and G-Craft
Toshiro Tsuchida worked for Japanese development studios Masaya and G-Craft, the latter of which he founded in 1993 after leaving Masaya. During the development of Front Mission 2 and Front Mission Alternative, Square initiated talks with Tsuchida in an attempt to purchase G-Craft in 1997. As the buyout occurred during Front Mission 2'''s development, it became the last title with G-Craft credited as the developer.

Square Enix
Tsuchida was also the battle director for both Final Fantasy X and Final Fantasy XIII. As battle director of Final Fantasy X, he changed the recurring battle system in the series. Whereas Hiroyuki Ito had created the Active Time Battle system in Final Fantasy IV, Tsuchida would create the Conditional Turn-Based Battle system to make things more strategic. He kept Final Fantasy IV in mind when working on Final Fantasy X. Tsuchida was the head of Product Development Division-6 within Square Enix.

He produced Final Fantasy Crystal Chronicles: My Life as a King, and stated that Square Enix was excited to be the first ones to bring a new game to Wiiware game platform. The game concept was to take the role of the king, not the hero, and the Crystal Chronicles series has a large amount of character interactions. Game development began before the Wiiware tools were distributed. Developing Final Fantasy Crystal Chronicles: My Life as a King required a change from the typical way the Square Enix developed games, switching from starting with the graphics and to beginning with gameplay.

He has recently worked on Final Fantasy XIII as the battle planning director in 2010. Toshiro left Square Enix Co., Ltd. on February 28, 2011.

GREE
He works in a department working with developers to create new video games.

Return to Sony
In 2016 he returned to work with Sony's ForwardWorks to develop a mobile Arc The Lad'' reboot

Games

Masaya

G-Craft

Square

Square Enix

References

External links

Toshiro Tsuchida profile at MobyGames

1964 births
Arc the Lad
Final Fantasy designers
Front Mission
Japanese video game designers
Japanese video game directors
Living people
Square Enix people